Reichenberg is a municipality in the district of Rhein-Lahn, in Rhineland-Palatinate, in western Germany.

Geography
Reichenberg is situated near the famous Loreley rock and lies approximately 2 km east of the river Rhine in the section known as the Rhine Gorge. The small village belongs to the UNESCO World Heritage Upper Middle Rhine Valley.

References

Municipalities in Rhineland-Palatinate
Rhein-Lahn-Kreis